Samera Paz is an artist and organizer from Washington D.C. born on May 19, 1994 and current student at the University of the Arts in Philadelphia. She is known for leading Girl Power Meetups in D.C. Paz mostly uses photography but has also done some performance art and works with themes such as gender, race, and mental health.

Work 
Paz started using menstrual blood to make her art when she was 16 and creates pieces that are mostly abstract, based in line, shapes, and patterns. Paz finds her blood and her art "natural and beautiful," and believes she's relieving the stigma around periods, but she received a lot of backlash after posting her work on social media.

She has been featured in several group exhibitions in galleries like Transformer in D.C. and aspires to be a war photographer.

Social movements and organizations 
While in D.C. in 2015, Paz founded a movement called Girl Power Meetups based in D.C., "run by women of color that aims to bring young women together to support, educate, connect and collaborate creatively." She started it because she wanted celebrations of women artists to cater more to young people and happen more often. "The events range from pure fun, like clothing swaps and yoga classes, to career development—and even a visit to the White House to meet with women working in prominent positions."

Along with Girl Power Meetups, Paz also runs Locals Only DC, which is a Tumblr page devoted to highlighting local talent with interviews and features with D.C. artists that goes unrecognized in the mainstream art scene.

Paz also founded Chocolate MLK, "a movement to celebrate and educate people on black history" which an emphasis on D.C. history and gentrification.

References

External links

Photographers from Washington, D.C.
American women performance artists
American performance artists
21st-century American photographers
African-American women artists
1994 births
Living people
21st-century American women photographers
African-American women musicians
21st-century African-American women
21st-century African-American artists